The 2021–22 season is Middlesbrough's 146th year in their history and fifth consecutive season in the Championship. Along with the league, the club will also compete in the FA Cup and the EFL Cup. The season covers the period from 1 July 2021 to 30 June 2022.

Statistics

Players with names in italics and marked * were on loan from another club for the whole of their season with Middlesbrough.

 

|-
!colspan=15|Players out on loan:

|-
!colspan=15|Players who have left the club:

|}

Goals record

Disciplinary record

Background and pre-season
Middlesbrough finished the 2020–21 season in 10th position in the EFL Championship.

Pre-season
Middlesbrough announced they will play friendly matches against Bishop Auckland, Saltash United, Tavistock, Plymouth Argyle, York City and Rotherham United as part of their pre-season preparations.

Competitions

Championship

League table

Results summary

Results by matchday

Matches
Middlesbrough's fixtures were revealed on 24 June 2021.

FA Cup

Middlesbrough were drawn away to Mansfield Town in the third round. In the quarter-final, Boro were handed a home tie against Premier League side Chelsea.

EFL Cup

Middlesbrough were drawn away to Blackpool in the first round.

Transfers

Transfers in

Loans in

Loans out

Transfers out

Notes

References

Middlesbrough
Middlesbrough F.C. seasons